Grant Forrest (born 19 June 1993) is a Scottish professional golfer. He plays on the European Tour, and won the 2021 Hero Open. Forrest had a successful amateur career which included being runner-up in the Amateur Championship and playing in the 2015 Walker Cup.

Amateur career
Forrest had an exceptionally successful amateur career. He won the Scottish Amateur in 2012 and the St Andrews Links Trophy in 2014. He reached the final of the 2015 Amateur Championship where he lost 4&2 to Romain Langasque and played in the Walker Cup later the same year.

Forrest played college golf at the University of San Diego where he won four events. He turned professional in late 2016.

Professional career
Forrest made his professional debut at the 2016 Alfred Dunhill Links Championship, finishing tied for 41st place. He played on the Challenge Tour in 2017 with a best finish of tied for second place in the Hainan Open and finished 34th in the Order of Merit.

Forrest played on the Challenge Tour again in 2018. In May he reached the final of the Andalucía Costa del Sol Match Play 9, losing to Liam Johnston in the final by 1 hole. The following month he lost to Stuart Manley in a playoff in the Hauts de France Golf Open, after making a bogey at the third extra hole. He was runner-up for the third time in the Hainan Open in October and finished 7th in the Order of Merit to earn a place on the 2019 European Tour.

Forrest finished 94th in the 2019 European Tour Order of Merit and 72nd in the 2020 Order of Merit, with five top-10 finishes over the two seasons.

In July 2021, Forrest was in contention to win the Dubai Duty Free Irish Open but after a par-5 at the 17th hole and a double-bogey 6 at the final hole he finished in a tie for fourth place. The following month he won the Hero Open by one stroke from James Morrison, finishing with two birdies at the last two holes.

Amateur wins
2009 Scottish Under 16 Championship
2010 Scottish Boys Championship
2012 Scottish Amateur
2013 West Coast Conference Championship, Saint Mary's Invitational
2014 The Farms Collegiate Invite, Seattle University Redhawk Invite, St Andrews Links Trophy
2016 Battle Trophy

Source:

Professional wins (1)

European Tour wins (1)

Playoff record
Challenge Tour playoff record (0–1)

Results in major championships

CUT = missed the half-way cut

Team appearances
Amateur
European Boys' Team Championship (representing Scotland): 2010, 2011
Jacques Léglise Trophy (representing Great Britain & Ireland): 2010
European Amateur Team Championship (representing Scotland): 2014, 2015 (winners), 2016 (winners)
Palmer Cup (representing Europe): 2014 (winners)
St Andrews Trophy (representing Great Britain & Ireland): 2014 (winners), 2016 (tie)
Eisenhower Trophy (representing Scotland): 2014, 2016
Walker Cup (representing Great Britain & Ireland): 2015 (winners)
Bonallack Trophy (representing Europe): 2016 (winners)

See also
2018 Challenge Tour graduates

References

External links

Scottish male golfers
San Diego Toreros men's golfers
Sportspeople from Livingston, West Lothian
Golfers from North Berwick
1993 births
Living people